The British Rail Class 13 was a type of diesel-electric shunting locomotive. The type was designed in 1965 because of the need to provide more powerful shunters for the Tinsley Marshalling Yard. Because of Tinsley's status as a hump yard, it was not possible to use a single locomotive owing to the risk of grounding. So, to achieve the required power, a pair of  shunters were permanently coupled in 'master and slave' formation, with the slave unit having had its cab removed. Both units were then ballasted to improve traction. Initially coupled cab-to-cab, it was found more practical to couple master nose to slave cab.

Units
Three pairs were formed as follows:

Withdrawal
With the end of hump shunting at Tinsley the class became obsolete. The unique qualities of the locomotives were not required elsewhere and so withdrawal was  inevitable; 13 002 was withdrawn in 1981, with the remaining two locomotives going with the closure of Tinsley hump in 1985. None of this unusual class survives.

References

Further reading

External links
   Image of 13001 at Tinsley MPD
   Photographs of 13003 at work at Tinsley hump Marshalling Yard

13
English Electric locomotives
C locomotives
Railway locomotives introduced in 1965
Cow-calf locomotives
Standard gauge locomotives of Great Britain
Scrapped locomotives
Diesel-electric locomotives of Great Britain
Shunting locomotives